Estádio Paulista, usually known as Estádio Paulista, or just Paulista, is a football (soccer) stadium in São Carlos, São Paulo, Brazil. The stadium has a maximum capacity of 4,000. It was inaugurated in 1921. The stadium is owned by the São Carlos City Hall, and its formal name honors Paulista Esporte Clube. Incorporated in 1951 by São Carlos Clube. São Carlos Clube usually plays their home matches at the stadium, and has a pitch size of 103 x 67 m. Paulista means Paulista.

History 
The inaugural match was played on April 21, 1921, when Paulista of Araraquara tied Paulista EC 2-2. The scorer of the first goal of the stadium is unknown.

The stadium's attendance record currently stands at 9,000 people, set on August 7, 1966 when São Carlos Clube and Palmeiras 4-4.

On February 27, 1966, the stadium lighting was inaugurated. Ferroviária beat São Carlos Clube 2–0 in the lighting inaugural match.

References 

Enciclopédia do Futebol Brasileiro, Volume 2 - Lance, Rio de Janeiro: Aretê Editorial S/A, 2001.

External links 
 Image Google maps

Paulista
São Carlos
Football venues in São Paulo (state)